Antonio Thrasybule Kébreau (November 11, 1909 – January 11, 1963) was Chairman of the Military Council (French: Président du Conseil militaire) that made him head of state of the Republic of Haiti from 14 June – 22 October 1957. His short reign followed that of Daniel Fignolé and preceded that of François Duvalier.

Haitian military leaders
1909 births
1963 deaths
Haitian anti-communists
People from Port-au-Prince
1950s in Haiti
20th-century Haitian politicians